Bamchu is a mountain of the Garhwal Himalaya in Uttarakhand India. It's situated on the eastern rim of Nanda Devi Sanctuary on the watershed of Milam Glacier and Nanda Devi basin. It is 124th highest located entirely within the Uttrakhand. Nanda Devi, is the highest mountain in this category. It lies 3.4 km South of Deo Damla  its nearest higher neighbor and 3.1 km SSE of Mangraon . Kalanka  lies 9.8 km NNW and 9.3 km SW lies Nanda Devi .

Climbing history
In 1975 Bamchu was first climbed by A Japanese team led by K Shimizu. The main team was focusing on Rishi pahar at the same time K. Konno who had to leave early choose to climb Bamchu. They set up an advance base camp at the foot of the south ridge of Bamchu. on 19 September K. Konno and liaison officer Capt. B. P. S Hundal made an attempt for the summit. They climbed the south ridge of the peak. After climbing for about ten hours, they reached the summit of Bamchu at 3.05 p.m.

Glaciers and rivers
Bamchu Glacier on the eastern side joins Milam Glacier from there emerges Goriganga River that later joins the Kali River at Jauljibi. Uttari Nanda Devi Glacier on the western side joins Uttari Rishi Glacier and drains into Rish Ganga. Rishi Ganga met with Dhauliganga River near Rini. Later Dhauli ganga met with Alaknanda at Vishnuprayag. Alaknanda River is one of the main tributaries of river Ganga that later joins Bhagirathi River the other main tributaries of river Ganga at Devprayag and became Ganga there after.

Neighboring peaks
Neighboring peaks of Sakram: 
 Nanda Devi: 
 Deo Damla: 
 Mangraon: 

 Lohar Deo: 
 Lhatu Dhura: 
 Rishi Kot: 
 Changabang:

See also

 List of Himalayan peaks of Uttarakhand

References

Mountains of Uttarakhand
Six-thousanders of the Himalayas
Geography of Chamoli district